A partial solar eclipse occurred on April 18, 1931. A solar eclipse occurs when the Moon passes between Earth and the Sun, thereby totally or partly obscuring the image of the Sun for a viewer on Earth. A partial solar eclipse occurs in the polar regions of the Earth when the center of the Moon's shadow misses the Earth.

Related eclipses

Solar eclipses 1928–1931

Notes

References

External links 

1931 4 18
1931 in science
1931 4 18
April 1931 events